Phạm Hùng (June 11, 1912 – March 10, 1988)  was a Vietnamese politician and the 2nd Prime Minister of the Government of the Socialist Republic of Vietnam from 1987 to 1988.

Life 
Phạm Hùng was born on June 11, 1912, in Vĩnh Long Province, in the Mekong River Delta of southern Vietnam. He Has been a member of the Communist Party of Indochina since 1930. The following year he was arrested by the French colonial authorities for killing a landowner and sentenced to death. His sentence was converted into a prison sentence. In 1936 he was amnestied. He was arrested again in 1939 and remained imprisoned until 1945 on the prison island Poulo Condore. During his imprisonment, he is described as one of the leaders of the Communist prisoners. During the First Indochina War, he was one of the active party leaders in the south of the country and although in a formally subordinate position, controlled large sections of the Viet Minh security forces in the south. In 1951 he was appointed as a member of the Central Committee of the party.

After the withdrawal of France Pham Hung was ordered in 1955 to Hanoi. In 1957 he became a member of the Politburo of the party. He was closely allied with Lê Duẩn who by early 1964 had become the effective leader of North Vietnam. Lê Duẩn and his supporters adopted a more belligerent approach to the armed struggle in South Vietnam in contrast to moderates such as Ho Chi Minh and Võ Nguyên Giáp.

In July 1967, after the mysterious death of Lê Duẩn ally, Nguyễn Chí Thanh, under the code name Bay Cuong, he took command of the Central Office for South Vietnam (COSVN). 

After the war, he returned to his role in the Politburo. In 1979 he became Minister of the Interior. In 1987 he took over the post of prime minister after the withdrawal of Phạm Văn Đồng.

During the Vietnam War he acted as commissar to the Vietcong. He also served as Interior Secretary before his relatively brief period as Prime Minister.

References

External links

1912 births
1988 deaths
People from Vĩnh Long province
Prime Ministers of Vietnam
Members of the 2nd Politburo of the Workers' Party of Vietnam
Members of the 3rd Politburo of the Workers' Party of Vietnam
Members of the 4th Politburo of the Communist Party of Vietnam
Members of the 5th Politburo of the Communist Party of Vietnam
Members of the 6th Politburo of the Communist Party of Vietnam
Members of the 2nd Secretariat of the Workers' Party of Vietnam
Members of the 3rd Secretariat of the Workers' Party of Vietnam
Members of the 2nd Central Committee of the Workers' Party of Vietnam
Members of the 3rd Central Committee of the Workers' Party of Vietnam
Members of the 4th Central Committee of the Communist Party of Vietnam
Members of the 5th Central Committee of the Communist Party of Vietnam
Members of the 6th Central Committee of the Communist Party of Vietnam
Deputy Prime Ministers of Vietnam
Interior ministers of Vietnam
Vietnamese nationalists
Vietnamese revolutionaries